Yuldashevo (Yuldaş) is a rural locality (a village) in Skvorchikhinsky Selsoviet, Ishimbaysky District, Bashkortostan, Russia. The population was 16 as of 2010. There is 1 street.

Geography 
Yuldashevo is located 16 km south of Ishimbay (the district's administrative centre) by road. Mikhaylovka is the nearest rural locality.

References 

Rural localities in Ishimbaysky District